Screenlets is the name of both a set of independently developed widget applications and the widget engine which runs them. The engine runs primarily on X11-based compositing window managers, most notably with Compiz on Linux.

Development 
Until 0.0.14, screenlets were exclusively scripted in Python and drawn in SVG. Afterward, support was added for web widgets (widgets which are written in HTML, JavaScript and CSS, similar to widgets for Apple Inc.'s Dashboard).  The engine also supports Google Gadgets.

See also 

 gDesklets
 Plasma widgets

References

External links
 Screenlets Forum
 List of 10 Best Screenlets

Widget engines